(Blossoming) is an opera after the short story Die Betrogene by Thomas Mann, with music by Vito Žuraj. The libretto was written by Händl Klaus. Commissioned by the Oper Frankfurt, the opera was first performed there on 22 January 2023, directed by Brigitte Fassbaender and conducted by Michael Wendeberg.

History 
Mann completed Die Betrogene, his last short story, in 1953. It was translated as The Black Swan. Händl Klaus wrote the libretto, commissioned by the Oper Frankfurt. He converted Mann's prose to dialogues in concise language, in seven scenes.

The opera was first performed in Frankfurt on 22 January 2023, directed by Brigitte Fassbaender in a stage design by Martina Segna with costumes by Anna-Sophie Lienbacher.  conducted the Ensemble Modern and a vocal ensemble of 12 soloists.

Roles

References 

Operas
German-language operas
English-language operas
2023 operas